Viriv is a village in Lviv Raion, Lviv Oblast, Ukraine.

As of the 2001 Ukrainian Census, its population was 360

Demography
According to the 2001 census, the majority of the population (99.72) spoke Ukrainian.

References

Villages in Lviv Raion